Anna Nerkagi is a Nenets writer, novelist, and social activist of the Nenets people in Siberia, writing in Russian language.

Biography 
Anna Pavlovna Nerkagi was born on February 15, 1951, on the Yamal Peninsula, near the Kara Sea coast in West Siberia, Russia. In 1958, at the age of six, she was removed from her parents by the Soviet authorities and forced to live in a boarding school, where the indigenous languages and native culture were banned. She was only allowed to visit her parents during holidays. In 1974, she graduated from the Geology Institute at Tyumen Technical University.

Nerkagi debuted as a writer with the autobiographic Aniko of the Nogo clan in 1977. 
She writes in the Russian language. In 1978, known for publishing Aniko, she became a member of the Writer's Union. She left Tyumen in 1980 and returned to the nomadic way of life in the Yamal Peninsula, where she lives with her husband. In 1990, she started the Tundra School for Nenets children. She currently lives and works near the village Laborovaya in the Yamal tundra, educating Nenets children.

In 2012, a documentary film about Nerkagi's life, directed by Ekaterina Golovnya, won the Grand Prix at the Radonezh film festival in Russia.

Bibliography 

 Aniko of the Nogo clan, 1977
 Ilir, 1979
 The White Yagel, 1986
 The Horde, 1992-1998 (dedicated to the memory of the poet Daniil Andreyev)
 White Arctic Moss, written in 1994, published unabridged in 1996 (a sequel to Aniko of the Nogo clan)

References 

1952 births
Living people
Nenets people
Russian women novelists
20th-century Russian novelists
20th-century Russian women writers
People from Yamalo-Nenets Autonomous Okrug